This Present Darkness is the debut EP of American heavy metal band Chimaira. As of 2007, the EP has sold more than 10,000 copies, and paved the way for the group’s debut album, Pass Out of Existence which would see a release the following year. Two songs from this EP, "Painting the White to Grey" and "Sphere," were re-recorded for the album's 2001 release.

Background
Track 13 is entitled "Empty" (6:23), track 14 is entitled "Silence" (3:21), and track 69 is a joke song entitled "Satan's Wizard" (2:07). Tracks 6-12 and 15-68 each contain 3 seconds of silence.

The hidden tracks, "Empty" and "Silence" were recorded with original bassist Andrew Ermlick. The band wanted the songs to be part of the EP, and they also wanted Ermlick to be part of the record. However, they didn't have the money to bring him in to re-record them so they used the demo versions of the tracks. The two tracks were hidden so that the CD could be sold at the price of an EP.

"Empty" features guest vocals from Rob of the band Canister.

"Silence" features guest vocals from John Marino, Doug Esper, and Dan Pelleteir.

The sample at the end of "Sphere" is taken from the film The Shawshank Redemption, a favorite of the band members'.

"Satan's Wizard" is not a live track; fake crowd noise was added to the recording, and the high pitched vocals are done by Ben Schigel of Sw1tched (the producer of this EP). At the end of the song, he deliberately  mispronounces the word 'Chimaira'.

2004 reissue
This Present Darkness was re-released and remastered with two included bonus tracks (but with "Satan's Wizard" omitted). This reissue of the EP came as a bonus item with the Dehumanizing Process DVD released on October 26, 2004. The bonus song “Refuse to See” that was included in this version is the same track that was included on the band’s 1999 MCD self-titled EP. But the song “Gag” is exclusive to this version only and was never released on any previous Chimaira albums.

"Gag" and "Refuse to See" were actually written while Hunter and Jim LaMarca were playing in Skipline, their prior hardcore band.

Cover art
The person who appears on the front cover is a heavily edited photo of drummer Andols Herrick.

Track listing

Personnel
Mark Hunter – vocals
Rob Arnold – guitar
Jason Hager – guitar
Rob Lesniak – bass (tracks 1-5)
Andrew Ermlick - bass on songs "Empty" and "Silence"
Andols Herrick – drums

References

Chimaira albums
2000 debut EPs